Remanzacco is a comune (municipality) in the Province of Udine in the Italian region Friuli-Venezia Giulia, located about  northwest of Trieste and about  northeast of Udine.

The municipality of Remanzacco contains the frazioni (subdivisions, mainly villages and hamlets) Ziracco, Selvis, Orzano, and Cerneglons.

Remanzacco borders the following municipalities: Faedis, Moimacco, Povoletto, Pradamano, Premariacco, Udine.

Demographic evolution

References

External links
 www.comune.remanzacco.ud.it

Cities and towns in Friuli-Venezia Giulia